Sara Ali Khan Pataudi (born 12 August 1995) is an Indian actress who works in Hindi films. Born into the Pataudi family, she is the daughter of actors Amrita Singh and Saif Ali Khan. After graduating with a degree in history and political science from Columbia University, Khan made her acting debut in 2018 with the romantic drama Kedarnath and the action comedy Simmba. Both films were commercially successful, and the former earned her the Filmfare Award for Best Female Debut.

Khan appeared in Forbes India Celebrity 100 list of 2019. Following two poorly received films, she starred in the drama Atrangi Re (2021).

Early life and background 
Sara Ali Khan was born on 12 August 1995 in Bombay, Maharashtra, India to Saif Ali Khan, son of Mansoor Ali Khan Pataudi and Sharmila Tagore, and Amrita Singh, daughter of Sardar Shivinder Singh Virk and socialite Rukhsana Sultana; both actors of the Hindi film industry. She is also the great-granddaughter of Iftikhar Ali Khan Pataudi and Sajida Sultan, and the niece of Soha Ali Khan and Saba Ali Khan. She has a younger brother, Ibrahim. Her two half brothers Taimur (born 2016) and Jehangir (born 2021), are Saif's sons from his second marriage to Kareena Kapoor. Sara Ali Khan is of Barech Pashtun Afghan, Bengali Hindu, and Assamese Muslim descent on her father's side, and of Punjabi Sikh and Punjabi Muslim descent on her mother's side. Sara was raised as a Muslim.

When Khan was a four-year-old, she acted in an advertisement. According to Saif, actress Aishwarya Rai proved to be her inspiration for pursuing a career in film after she saw her perform on stage in Chicago. In 2004, when Khan was nine, her parents divorced, and Singh was granted legal guardianship of her children. Saif was initially not allowed to see her or her brother; they have since reconciled, and, according to Saif, "are more like friends [than father and daughter]". Khan also shares a healthy relationship with Kapoor, her step-mother; she stated in 2018, "I would like to imbibe her professionalism in me".

As a teenager, Khan struggled with her weight, and had to undergo daily workouts under a strict schedule to get fit. She was also diagnosed with polycystic ovary syndrome, which she ascribes as a cause for her weight gain. Khan studied history and political science at Columbia University in New York. In 2016, she completed her graduation early, within three years, and took off the remaining one-and-a-half years for weight training, following which she returned to India.

Career 
Khan's debut came in 2018 with Abhishek Kapoor's romantic  film Kedarnath, in which she played a Hindu girl who falls in love with a Muslim porter, played by Sushant Singh Rajput. In preparation for her role, Khan improved her knowledge of Hindi vocabulary with help from Rajput. Kedarnath received mixed reviews with praise directed to Khan's performance. Kunal Guha of Mumbai Mirror found it to be a rehash of 1980s Hindi films but appreciated Khan's act: "When her Mukku is angry, hopeful, desperate or coltish, she often conveys it through her eyes alone — giving us a taste of the diverse faces she can throw on." Meena Iyer of Daily News and Analysis similarly labelled her "spectacular". Kedarnath emerged as a commercial success with a gross of over 960 million Indian Rupees. Khan was awarded with the Filmfare Award for Best Female Debut and the IIFA Award for Star Debut of the Year – Female.

A few weeks after the release of Kedarnath, Khan starred in Rohit Shetty's action film Simmba, alongside Ranveer Singh, which was loosely based on the Telugu-language film Temper (2015). She began work on it when filming of Kedarnath was temporarily suspended. This led to Abhishek Kapoor suing Khan; they later settled out of court when she agreed to split her time between both films. Reviewing the film for The Times of India, Ronak Kotecha opined that Khan had "precious little to do besides looking breathtakingly beautiful" and disliked the chemistry between her and Singh.

In Imtiaz Ali's romantic drama Love Aaj Kal (2020), a spiritual successor to Ali's 2009 film of the same name, Khan starred as a young woman with a troubled past, opposite Kartik Aaryan. In a negative review of the film, Nandini Ramnath of Scroll.in bemoaned that Khan "simply doesn’t have the experience or the expertise" to play a complex character, adding that "having a camera shoved into her young face only enlarges her shortcomings". It emerged as a box office bomb. In the same year, Khan starred opposite Varun Dhawan in the comedy film Coolie No. 1, an adaptation of David Dhawan's 1995 film of the same name. The film had a strong viewership on Amazon Prime but it was unanimously panned by film critics. Khan was criticised for not adding any value to the film, with Anna M. M. Vetticad of Firstpost opining that Khan does nothing more than fill the slot of "the hero’s love interest".

In 2021, Khan featured as a woman with post-traumatic stress disorder in Aanand L. Rai's drama Atrangi Re, co-starring Akshay Kumar and Dhanush, which premiered on Disney+ Hotstar after multiple delays due to the nationwide lockdown due to the pandemic. The film received mixed reviews from critics. Monika Rawal Kukreja of Hindustan Times called her the "soul" of the film and praised her acting range and her Bihari accent. Conversely, in his review for Mint, Uday Bhatia criticised her "grating Bihari accent".

Khan will next star in Laxman Utekar's as-yet untitled next opposite Vicky Kaushal, and in Gaslight alongside Vikrant Massey. She will also portray freedom fighter Usha Mehta in the biopic Ae Watan Mere Watan, which will stream on Amazon Prime Video.

In the media 
Khan was ranked ninth in Rediff's Best Actresses of 2021 List. 

Khan was ranked seventh in GQ Indias listing of the 30 most influential young Indians. Apart from acting, she is a celebrity endorser for several brands and products, including Fanta, Puma, and Veet.

Filmography

Films

Awards and nominations

Notes

References

External links 

 
 
 
 

1995 births
Living people
Indian film actresses
Actresses in Hindi cinema
Actresses from Mumbai
Columbia College (New York) alumni
Filmfare Awards winners
Screen Awards winners
International Indian Film Academy Awards winners
21st-century Indian actresses
Indian people of Pashtun descent